Zeroth-order logic is first-order logic without variables or quantifiers. Some authors use the phrase "zeroth-order logic" as a synonym for the propositional calculus, but an alternative definition extends propositional logic by adding constants, operations, and relations on non-Boolean values. Every zeroth-order language in this broader sense is complete and compact.

References 

Propositional calculus
Systems of formal logic